Henri Noël (11 September 1937 – 17 October 2020) was a French football player and coach.

Career
Born in Mollégès, Noël played as a defender for Nîmes B, Nîmes, SSMC Miramas and Avignon.

He later became a coach, managing Nîmes B, Nîmes and FC Martigues.

He died of a heart attack on 17 October 2020, aged 83.

References

1937 births
2020 deaths
French footballers
Nîmes Olympique players
AC Avignonnais players
Ligue 1 players
Ligue 2 players
Championnat National players
Association football defenders
French football managers
Nîmes Olympique managers
FC Martigues managers